Vinod Patel is a Fiji Indian businessman, soccer administrator and politician. He is the chair of Vinod Patel and Company Limited which owns a chain of hardware shops throughout Fiji.

Vinod Patel is a strong supporter of the Ba football team and was their President and Fiji Team director.

He entered politics as a councillor in Ba Town Council. He was subsequently elected the mayor and served two successful terms before moving to national politics. He easily won the Ba West Indian Communal Constituency for the National Federation Party in the 1994 general election. During the 1999 and 2001 elections he attempted to re-enter Parliament as a member for Ba West Indian Communal Constituency but was easily defeated by the Fiji Labour Party candidate.

Awards and achievements

References 

Fijian people of Gujarati descent
National Federation Party politicians
Indian members of the House of Representatives (Fiji)
Fijian Hindus
Living people
1939 births
Mayors of Ba (town)
Recipients of Pravasi Bharatiya Samman